Jemina Durning Smith (1843–1901) was a British philanthropist.

She was the daughter of the Manchester cotton merchant, John Benjamin Smith, who in 1835 becoming the founding chairman of the Anti-Corn Law League, and his wife Jemina Durning, who was an heiress from Liverpool.

She paid for the Durning Library is a Grade II listed library at 167 Kennington  Lane, Kennington, London SE11, designed by Sidney R. J. Smith, in the Gothic Revival style.

She never married.

References

1843 births
1901 deaths
19th-century British philanthropists
19th-century women philanthropists